Thomas Olney (ca. 1600–1682) was an early minister at the First Baptist Church in America and one of the first proprietors in Providence Plantations.

Immigration to New England
Olney was born in England in 1600 and was trained as a shoemaker. He married Marie Ashton at St. Albans Abbey in Hertfordshire, England on September 16, 1629, and they begot sons Thomas and Epenetus.

Olney and his family immigrated to Salem, Massachusetts on the ship Planter in April 1635. They were asked to leave Massachusetts Bay Colony due to religious differences, and they moved to Providence in 1638 following Roger Williams. He signed the Providence agreement to form a government in 1640, and he was one of the original 12 persons to whom Roger Williams deeded land that he had purchased from Canonicus and Miantonomi on October 8, 1638.

Olney served the town in various capacities including the first Treasurer, Court Assistant, Town Councilman, Clerk, Assistant to the General Court of Trials, Commissioner, Justice of the Peace, and tax collector, and he was on a sub-committee to prevent sale of ammunition to the Indians.  He was named as one of the ten Assistants to the Governor in the Royal Charter of 1663, a document which served as the basis for Rhode Island's government for nearly two centuries.

First Baptist Church
Olney was one of the original members of the First Baptist Church in Providence, but he and several others withdrew from the Six-Principle Baptists under William Wickenden's leadership to found a second church in 1653/4. He served as lay pastor for this small congregation until his death in Providence between June 16 and October 9, 1682.

See also

 List of early settlers of Rhode Island
 Colony of Rhode Island and Providence Plantations

References

External links
Olney Information
A genealogy of the descendants of Thomas Olney: an original proprietor of Providence, R.I., who came from England in 1635 (1889)

English emigrants
People of colonial Rhode Island
17th-century Baptist ministers from the United States
1682 deaths
Year of birth uncertain
1600s births